Nathaniel Moore (born September 19, 1951) is an American former professional football player who was a wide receiver in the National Football League (NFL) for 13 seasons during the 1970s and 1980s.  Moore played college football for the Florida Gators, and thereafter, he played professionally for the Miami Dolphins of the NFL.  He is best known as a favorite passing target of Dolphins quarterbacks Bob Griese and Dan Marino.         Nat Moore is also credited as football consultant in the 1977 movie Black Sunday.

Early years 

Moore was born in Tallahassee, Florida in 1951.  He grew up in Miami, Florida and attended Miami Edison Senior High School and  Miami-Dade Community College.

College career 

On the recommendation of his junior college football coach, Moore received an athletic scholarship to transfer from the University of Tennessee at Martin to the University of Florida in Gainesville, Florida, where he was a star running back for coach Doug Dickey's Gators teams in 1972 and 1973.  As a junior in 1972, Moore led the Gators with 145 rushes for 845 yards and nine rushing touchdowns, 25 receptions for 351 receiving yards and four touchdown catches, and 230 return yards, while earning first-team All-Southeastern Conference (SEC) and honorable mention All-American accolades.

Moore graduated from Florida with a bachelor's degree in exercise and sport science in 1975, and he was inducted into the University of Florida Athletic Hall of Fame as a "Gator Great" in 1978.  In a 2006 article series published by The Gainesville Sun, the newspaper's sportswriters ranked him as No. 49 among the 100 all-time greatest Florida Gators of the team's first 100 seasons.

Professional career 

The catch was a crucial third-down conversion, leading to a score and a come-from-behind win in a closely contested divisional game.

His final career receiving statistics were 510 catches for 7,547 yards and 74 touchdowns.  He also rushed for 249 yards and a touchdown, returned 27 punts for 297 yards, and gained 856 yards on 33 kickoff returns.

Career statistics

Regular season

Life after football 

Moore is also known for his humanitarian work and philanthropy.  In , the NFL voted Moore as "Man of the Year," an honor given to a player who gives outstanding service to his community.  Moore also received the Byron White Humanitarian Award in 1986.  He created The Nat Moore Foundation, an organization through which he continues to work with disadvantaged youths in the Miami-Dade County area, in 1998.

On December 5, 1999 he was added to the Miami Dolphins Honor Roll.

Moore was a football broadcaster for Florida Gators football games on Sun Sports until 2011.  As an announcer, he was notorious for adding an "s" to the last names of various players (Chris Leak became "Chris Leaks," Percy Harvin became "Harvins," etc.)  In addition, he teams with Bob Griese to provide television analysis of preseason Dolphins games.  He also owns a sports promotions firm, Nat Moore & Associates, Inc.  He is a vice president in the Miami Dolphins organization and oversees the Miami Dolphins Alumni Association, and also serves as the executive director of the NFL Super Bowl Football Clinic.

See also 

 Florida Gators football, 1970–79
 List of Florida Gators in the NFL Draft
 List of Miami Dolphins players
 List of University of Florida alumni
 List of University of Florida Athletic Hall of Fame members

References

Bibliography 

 Carlson, Norm, University of Florida Football Vault: The History of the Florida Gators, Whitman Publishing, LLC, Atlanta, Georgia (2007).  .
 Golenbock, Peter, Go Gators!  An Oral History of Florida's Pursuit of Gridiron Glory, Legends Publishing, LLC, St. Petersburg, Florida (2002).  .
 Hairston, Jack, Tales from the Gator Swamp: A Collection of the Greatest Gator Stories Ever Told, Sports Publishing, LLC, Champaign, Illinois (2002).  .
 McCarthy, Kevin M.,  Fightin' Gators: A History of University of Florida Football, Arcadia Publishing, Mount Pleasant, South Carolina (2000).  .
 McEwen, Tom, The Gators: A Story of Florida Football, The Strode Publishers, Huntsville, Alabama (1974).  .
 Nash, Noel, ed., The Gainesville Sun Presents The Greatest Moments in Florida Gators Football, Sports Publishing, Inc., Champaign, Illinois (1998).  .

1951 births
Living people
American Conference Pro Bowl players
American football wide receivers
College football announcers
Florida Gators football players
Miami Dade College alumni
Miami Dolphins announcers
Miami Dolphins players
Players of American football from Tallahassee, Florida
Miami Edison Senior High School alumni
Ed Block Courage Award recipients